William McGhee (July 24, 1930 – February 17, 2007) was an American stage, film and television actor. He was also known professionally as Bill McGee, Bill McGhee and William Bill McGhee.

Hotel explosion
On June 21, 1946, aged 15, McGhee held an elevator operator job at the Baker Hotel in downtown Dallas, when an ammonia explosion occurred during work on a refrigeration unit. He was temporarily reported as dead in the media, but he survived. He suffered amnesia, but was fully restored to health. He resumed his pursuit for the theater after recovery.

Korean War
He served his country as an Army corporal in the 31st Unit division in the Korean War, and performed for the troops at Camp Atterbury, Indiana. He was among the soldiers exposed to atmospheric nuclear testing at Yucca Flats, Nevada to measure the bomb's consequences. He was reportedly selected for the mission because of the injuries he had survived in the Baker Hotel blast.

Acting career
After his honorable discharge from the military, McGhee returned to performing at the Dallas Theater Center's Janus Players. In 1954, he broke racial barriers and was the first African-American actor to perform professionally on the Dallas stage in roles without racial requirements. He performed in more than 35 theater productions and stage plays, and in more than 15 films, including High Yellow (1965), Curse of the Swamp Creature (1966), Don't Look in the Basement (1973), Drive-In (1976), 1918 (1985) and Riverbend (1989).

He was one of the first unionized African-American actors in Dallas with SAG (Screen Actors Guild) and AFTRA (American Federation of Television and Radio Artists).

Death
McGhee died from male breast cancer, aged 76. He was survived by his wife, Ina B. Daniels Hurdle-McGhee, a civil rights activist, as well as by his children: a son, Derek McGhee, a daughter, Dawn McGhee, an actress/director/producer. He was also survived by ten siblings.

Filmography

References

External links

1930 births
2007 deaths
African-American male actors
American male film actors
American male stage actors
American male television actors
Male actors from Dallas
United States Army personnel of the Korean War
Deaths from male breast cancer
Deaths from cancer in Texas
20th-century American male actors
United States Army soldiers
People with amnesia
20th-century African-American people
21st-century African-American people